Philip Griffiths may refer to:
Phillip Griffiths (born 1938), American mathematician
Philip Jones Griffiths (1936–2008), Welsh photojournalist
Philip Lewis Griffiths (1881–1945), Australian judge
Phil Griffiths (footballer) (1905–1978), Welsh international footballer
Phil Griffiths (cyclist) (born 1949), former English racing cyclist
Philip Griffiths (diplomat), New Zealand diplomat
Philip Griffiths (sport shooter)